Gitte Kousgaard Pedersen (born 22 January 1979) is a Danish international footballer, currently playing for B93/HIK/Skjold in the Elitedivisionen. While in a relationship with male footballer Thomas Gravesen, she previously played in Germany with SV Hamburg and England with Everton. Gravesen was playing professionally for the male versions of the teams at the time.

Pedersen returned to Denmark to train as a nurse. In 2013, she was working in the accident & emergency department of Bispebjerg Hospital.

References

External links
 Gitte Pedersen profile at Danish Football Association website

Danish women's footballers
Denmark women's international footballers
Danish expatriate sportspeople in England
Danish expatriate sportspeople in Germany
Expatriate women's footballers in England
Expatriate women's footballers in Germany
1979 births
Living people
Everton F.C. (women) players
FA Women's National League players
Hamburger SV (women) players
Women's association football midfielders
Association footballers' wives and girlfriends